Xenia Knoll and Aleksandra Krunić were the defending champions, but Knoll chose to compete in Prague instead. Krunić played alongside Daria Gavrilova, but lost in the semifinals to Tímea Babos and Andrea Hlaváčková.

Babos and Hlaváčková went on to win the title, defeating Nina Stojanović and Maryna Zanevska in the final, 2–6, 6–3, [10–5].

Seeds

Draw

Draw

References
 Main Draw

Grand Prix SAR La Princesse Lalla Meryem - Doubles
2016 Doubles
2017 in Moroccan tennis